Konglungen is a village in Asker municipality, Norway.

Its population in 1999 was 208, but since 2001 it is not considered an urban settlement by Statistics Norway, and its data is therefore not registered.

References

Villages in Viken (county)
Villages in Akershus
Villages in Asker
Villages in Northern Asker
Asker